Saad Dahlab (b. in Ksar Chellala, April 18, 1918 - d. December 16, 2000 in Algiers) was an Algerian nationalist and politician. A long-time national activist, he played a part in virtually all the early Algerian nationalist movements: L'Étoile Nord-Africaine (ENA), the Parti du Peuple Algérien (PPA) and the Mouvement pour la Triomphe des Libertés Démocratiques (MTLD), all of them headed by Messali Hadj.

Biography 
He was jailed by France 1945–46.

After becoming part of the internal anti-Hadj opposition in the PPA-MTLD, he joined the emergent Front de libération nationale (FLN) splinter group, which began an armed rebellion in 1954. During the Algerian war of independence (1954–62), he was involved with the creation of El Moudjahid—the FLN bulletin that evolved into independent Algeria's main French language daily—as well as with radio transmissions and other propaganda efforts.  He also served as minister of foreign affairs in the 1961-62 version of the group's exile government (the GPRA). After independence in 1962 he served as diplomat in Morocco, and pursued a career in business. In his later years, he started a publishing company, and among other things published his memoirs of the war years.

1918 births
2000 deaths
Étoile Nord-Africaine politicians
Algerian People's Party politicians
Movement for the Triumph of Democratic Liberties politicians
National Liberation Front (Algeria) politicians
Algerian diplomats
Government ministers of Algeria
Algerian expatriates in Morocco
People from Tiaret Province
Ambassadors of Algeria to Morocco
Foreign ministers of Algeria